GWS may refer to:

 Game-winning shots, the official IIHF name for an ice hockey penalty shootout
 George Wright Society, an American environmental and heritage organization
 Gerakan Wanita Sosialis, an Indonesian women's organization
 Girls With Slingshots, a webcomic
 Google Web Server
 GodWeenSatan: The Oneness, a 1990 Album released by American rock band, Ween
 Grand Wing Servo-Tech, a Taiwanese manufacturer of radio controlled aircraft
 Great Western Society, an English railway preservation society
 Great White Spot, periodic storms on Saturn
 Greater Western Sydney, Sydney, Australia
 Greater Western Sydney Giants, an Australian rules football club
 Growing Without Schooling, a defunct American homeschooling newsletter
 Gulf War syndrome